Rebar is a steel bar or mesh of steel wires used as a tension device in reinforced concrete and reinforced masonry.

Rebar may also refer to:

Rebar (Taiwan), a company in Taiwan
Rebar art and design studio, an art studio in San Francisco, United States

People with the surname
Edward Rebar, American biologist
Kelly Rebar (born 1956), Canadian playwright and screenwriter